Mocis undata, the brown-striped semilooper, is a moth of the family Erebidae. The species was first described by Johan Christian Fabricius in 1775. It is found in the Afrotropical and Oriental regions, including India and Sri Lanka.

Description
Male with mid and hind tibia clothed with long hair. Body pale red-brown. Abdomen pale fuscous, the anal tuft ochreous. Forewing with a short sub-basal red-brown line. An oblique antemedial pale of ochreous line present, with diffused red-brown band on its outer edge. A sinuous medial line angled on median nervure. Reniform large and indistinct. A red-brown diffused postmedial band, on which is a dark line slightly curved outwards beyond the cell, and at vein 2, it is very irregularly curved inwards to lower angle of cell, then descending to inner margin. An indistinct pale waved sub-marginal line present with a black specks series on it. There is a dark waved marginal line. Hindwings ochreous fuscous, with narrow fuscous medial band and diffused sub-marginal band. Legs rufous.

Larva purplish brown speckled with black. The lateral area yellowish with red lines. A sub-lateral row of small black dots present. Head brownish with red lateral streak. Pupa efflorescent. The larvae feed on Cytisus, Desmodium, Wisteria, Arachis, Butea, Cajanus, Calopogonium, Crotalaria, Derris, Glycine, Indigofera, Mucuna, Phaseolus, Pueraria, Rhynchosia, Tephrosia, Vigna, Shorea, Hevea, Gossypium, Nephelium and Solanum species.

References

External links
A note on record of parasites of Mocis undata

Moths of Africa
Moths of Asia
Moths of Japan
Moths described in 1775
undata
Taxa named by Johan Christian Fabricius